is a manga series written and illustrated by Kajio. It is an adaptation of Buronson and Tetsuo Hara's Fist of the North Star in a chibi art style.

Plot
The story takes place in an alternative world in which the nuclear war of 199X (in the original series) never occurred. Thus, Kenshiro, Raoh and Toki find themselves pitted against one another not just for the affection of the beautiful Yuria but also a part-time job at Ryuryuken Convenience Store. However, they must work together if they want to stand a chance against greater competition including the South Star District led by the manipulative Shin who also has a crush on Yuria.

Media

Manga
DD Fist of the North Star was first announced in 2008 as an anime to commemorate the 25th anniversary of Buronson and Hara's series. However, it was first made into a manga, which started to be serialized in Monthly Comic Zenon by its first issue on October 25, 2010. Its run was completed on the August issue released on June 25, 2016. The individual chapters were collected into eight tankōbon volumes by Tokuma Shoten; the first was released on June 20, 2011 and the last was released on August 20, 2016.

Anime
In December, through Zenons February issue, an anime television series was announced to debut in 2011. A Flash series, it was directed by Kajio himself, and aired on Kansai TV between January 11, and April 5, 2011, lasting 12 episodes. The entire series was released on DVD by TC Entertainment on October 26, 2012.

To celebrate the series's 30th anniversary, a second anime adaptation was announced in January 2013, through Zenons March issue. Produced by Ajia-do Animation Works under the direction of Akitaro Daichi, 13 episodes were broadcast by TV Tokyo from April 2, to June 25, 2013. Four DVDs collecting the episodes were released between June 28, and September 27, 2013. The anime was streamed by Crunchyroll; the first two episodes were available from June 4, 2013, with three more episodes streamed every week there after. In December 2014, Sentai Filmworks announced the licensing of the series to the North American digital and home media market. Sentai released it on DVD and Blu-Ray on April 14, 2015, and also made it available through the streaming site Hidive, and on iTunes, Microsoft Store and PlayStation Store.

In August 2015, a sequel series was announced through the sixth manga volume. Featuring the same cast and mostly the same staff, the series was broadcast on TV Tokyo as part of a DD Hokuto no Ken 2 Ichigo Aji+ program along with the Hokuto no Ken: Ichigo Aji anime adaptation. The first episode aired on October 6, 2015, and the twelve and last was broadcast on December 22, 2015. It was licensed by Crunchyroll to be exhibited simultaneously with Japanese airing.

References

External links

2010 manga
2013 anime television series debuts
Anime series based on manga
Ajia-do Animation Works
Comedy anime and manga
Fist of the North Star
Seinen manga
Sentai Filmworks
Slice of life anime and manga
Tokuma Shoten manga
TV Tokyo original programming